Villingen (Schwarzwald) station (officially called Villingen (Schwarzw) by Deutsche Bahn) is one of two stations in Villingen-Schwenningen in the German state of Baden-Württemberg. The other is Schwenningen (Neckar). In addition, there are five more halts (Haltepunkte). The station is located east of the old town of Villingen beyond the Brigach. It is located at 704 metres above sea level on the Black Forest Railway and it is the terminus of the Rottweil–Villingen railway.

History

The building was built before 1869. The station was owned by the Grand Duchy of Baden State Railway (Großherzoglich Badische Staatseisenbahnen). Since, however, it was the terminus of the Rottweil–Villingen railway of the Royal Württemberg State Railways (Königlich Württembergischen Staats-Eisenbahnen), a locomotive shed and residential building for railway staff were operated by the Württemberg Railways in Villingen in Baden. The two railways shared a goods shed.

The central block of the present-day entrance building has been renovated several times, most recently on the occasion of the 1000th anniversary of Villingen in 1999.

The Black Forest Railway was electrified in 1972. The section from Offenburg to Villingen was electrified on 28 September 1975 and the line from Villingen to Constance in 1977. The electrification of the line to Villingen brought the amount of electrified railway in the West Germany to 10,000 km, which is marked by a memorial plaque at the station.

Rail services

There are direct connections to, among other places, Ulm, Konstanz, Karlsruhe and Neustadt im Schwarzwald.

Long distance

Villingen (Schwarzw) station is served by a pair of InterCity services operated by Deutsche Bahn, called the Bodensee ("Lake Constance"), running between Emden and Konstanz. Frequently the station is used in the summer months to reach the tourist regions of the Black Forest and Constance. The pair of IC services called Schwarzwald ("Black Forest") from Hamburg to Constance was discontinued in December 2014 due to low patronage.

Regional services

Development

The station is to be upgraded to make it fully accessible by 2018. For this purpose two lifts will be installed and the platforms are to be raised to allow the level boarding of trains. The cost is estimated to be €3 million and the city will contribute €750,000 and the rest will be funded by Deutsche Bahn.

References

External links 

 

Railway stations in Germany opened in 1869
Buildings and structures in Schwarzwald-Baar-Kreis
Railway stations in Baden-Württemberg
19th-century establishments in Württemberg
Villingen-Schwenningen